Kyah Cahill (born 13 March 2003) is a Samoan footballer currently playing for the Lusail Football Academy and the Samoa national under-20 football team.

Club career

Youth
Until 2019 Cahill was playing youth football in New Jersey, United States where the family lived while his father played for the New York Red Bulls from 2012 to 2015. He played high school soccer for Northern Highlands Regional High School from 2017 to 2019.

In 2019 he joined the academy of League Two club Macclesfield Town. He was a consistent scorer for the U19 squad and earned at least one Man-of-the-Match honour. He left in 2020 when the club folded because of financial difficulties. Following his departure, he joined the academy of CD Leganés of Spain's Segunda División. In March 2021 he joined the academy of fellow Madrid-based club Rayo Vallecano of La Liga.

By 2022 Cahill had joined the Lusail Football Academy in Doha, Qatar.

International career 
In August 2022 he was included in Samoa's roster for the 2022 OFC U-19 Championship. This was Cahill's first international call-up for Samoa. He made his international debut on 14 September 2022, in a 0–4 loss to New Caledonia in the Group stage of the tournament.

Personal life
Cahill is the son of Socceroos player Tim Cahill and nephew of Samoan former internationals Sean Cahill and Chris Cahill. As a youth his interests were in the performing arts which led him to auditions for Disney and Broadway.

References 

2003 births
Living people
Australian soccer players
Samoan footballers
Association football forwards
Expatriate footballers in England
Expatriate footballers in Spain
Expatriate footballers in Qatar
Australian sportspeople of Samoan descent